Little Bit of Everything is the third studio album by American country music singer Billy Currington. It was released on October 14, 2008 via Mercury Nashville. Its lead-off single, "Don't", became his sixth Top 10 hit on the U.S. Billboard Hot Country Songs chart. Before that song, Currington released a song in late 2007 called "Tangled Up", which peaked at number 30 and was not included on an album. "People Are Crazy" was released as the second single in March 2009 and became Currington's third number one hit in August 2009. The third single, "That's How Country Boys Roll," was released in September 2009 and became his fourth Number One single in March 2010. The album has sold over 500,000 copies as of October 2010.

Track listing

Personnel
 Billy Currington - lead vocals
 Chip Davis - background vocals 
 Scotty Emerick - gut string guitar on "I Shall Return"
 Paul Franklin - steel guitar on all tracks except "That's How Country Boys Roll", lap steel guitar on "That's How Country Boys Roll"
 Tony Harrell - keyboards 
 Wes Hightower - background vocals
 Troy Lancaster - electric guitar
 Paul Leim - drums
 Brent Mason - electric guitar  
 W. David Smith - bass guitar 
 Biff Watson - acoustic guitar

Chart performance

Weekly charts

Year-end charts

Singles

Certifications

References

External links 
 Billboard review of Little Bit of Everything

2008 albums
Mercury Nashville albums
Billy Currington albums
Albums produced by Carson Chamberlain